Gene Lyda (born June 20, 1947) was raised in the San Antonio, Texas area and gained regional fame as a professional bull rider.  Lyda now manages the Fort Stockton Division of La Escalera Ranch, one of the largest Black Angus cattle ranches in Texas.

Background
Gene Lyda was born in the South Texas brush country in Nixon, Texas on June 20, 1947.  Lyda competed in the bareback bronc riding, roping and bull riding as a youth.  In 1966, he won the State High School Bull Riding Championship in Hallettsville, Texas, the 1966 National High School Bull Riding championship in Wetumka, Oklahoma and the Levi's Award - Reserve All Around Cowboy Championship.

Bull riding career
He immediately joined the Rodeo Cowboys Association (now the Professional Rodeo Cowboys Association) and competed in the bull riding at intercollegiate rodeos while on a rodeo scholarship with Southwest Texas Junior College in Uvalde, Texas.  In 1967, Lyda won the National Intercollegiate Rodeo Association Reserve Champion Bull Riding title.

Lyda competed professionally at National Western Stock Show Rodeo, Grand National Rodeo, Cheyenne Frontier Days, Pendleton Round-Up, American Royal Rodeo, Houston Livestock Show and Rodeo, Fort Worth Stock Show and Rodeo and Calgary Stampede.  In 1967, he qualified to compete at the National Finals Rodeo in Oklahoma City, Oklahoma as one of the Top 15 Bull Riders in the nation.  At the Finals, Lyda rode 7 out of 8 bulls at the National Finals Rodeo.

See also
Pecos County, Texas
Gerald Lyda
Professional Rodeo Cowboys Association
National Finals Rodeo
Bull Riding
Rodeo

References

External links 
 National High School Rodeo Association - Past Champions

1947 births
American cattlemen
Ranchers from Texas
People from San Antonio
Living people
People from Nixon, Texas
Bull riders
People from Truth or Consequences, New Mexico